Mount Topham, is a  mountain summit located in Glacier National Park of British Columbia, Canada. It is part of the Selkirk Mountains range. Its nearest higher peak is Mount Selwyn,  to the west. Mount Topham is situated along the western edge of the Deville Glacier. Precipitation runoff from the mountain drains into the Beaver River. Mount Topham was named in 1902 by Arthur Oliver Wheeler to honor Harold Ward Topham (1857–1915), an English mountaineer who explored and mapped the Selkirks. The mountain's name was officially adopted September 8, 1932, by the Geographical Names Board of Canada. Based on the Köppen climate classification, Mount Topham is located in a subarctic climate zone with cold, snowy winters, and mild summers.

See also
Geography of British Columbia

References

External links
 Weather forecast: Mount Topham

Two-thousanders of British Columbia
Selkirk Mountains
Glacier National Park (Canada)
Kootenay Land District